The Office of Inspector General (OIG) in the U.S. Agency for International Development (USAID) is responsible for detecting and preventing fraud, waste, abuse, and violations of law and to promote economy, efficiency and effectiveness in the operations of USAID, the Millennium Challenge Corporation, the United States African Development Foundation, and the Inter-American Foundation.  

The OIG fulfills these responsibilities by conducting audits, investigations, and other reviews.  OIG accomplishments are reported in semiannual reports to the Congress.  OIG’s published plans and reports, testimony, and press releases are available on its Web site. The underlying law laying out the OIG's authority, responsibility, and reporting requirements is the Inspector General Act of 1978, as amended.

OIG is organized into three operational units:  Audit, Investigations, and Management.  It has eleven overseas offices located in Bangkok, Thailand; Cairo, Egypt; Dakar, Senegal; Frankfurt, Germany; Islamabad, Pakistan; Manila, Philippines; Port-au-Prince, Haiti; Pretoria, South Africa; San Salvador, El Salvador; and Tel Aviv, Israel.

History of Inspectors General

References

External links
 

United States Agency for International Development
Agency for International Development Office of Inspector General